The third courtyard is one of four at Prague Castle, in Prague, Czech Republic. It features an obelisk and statue of Saint George.

External links

 

Prague Castle